Hypericum quitense is a species of flowering plant in the family Hypericaceae. It is endemic to Ecuador. Its occurs in several types of habitats at elevations between 2,000 and 4,050 meters in the Andes.

References

quitense
Endemic flora of Ecuador
Taxonomy articles created by Polbot